Interstate 265 (I-265) was an Interstate Highway in Nashville, Tennessee. It ran on the northern part of the Nashville downtown loop from 1965 to April 7, 2000. It was replaced by a reroute of its parent highway, I-65. It ran for only .

Route description

The highway started at the western end of the I-40 portion of the downtown loop, at I-40 exit 208. It went north and intersected U.S. Route 41A (US 41A, Rosa L. Parks Boulevard [then-called 8th Ave N, and later MetroCenter Blvd]), which was the only exit. It then crossed the Cumberland River on the Lyle H. Fulton Memorial Bridge, and ended at an intersection with I-65 and I-24.

History
I-265 opened to traffic on March 15, 1971. It formed a link between I-65 and I-40 and formed the entire northwest portion of the Nashville downtown loop. The auxiliary route formed traffic problems on the loop as people preferred the main I-65 route over the auxiliary loop. In 2000, the designation was eliminated as I-65 was rerouted on the northwest and southwest parts of the downtown loop in an attempt to combat traffic issues.

Exit list

References

External links

65-2
Transportation in Davidson County, Tennessee
65-2 Tennessee
Interstate 65